Old Sydney Town was an Australian open-air museum and theme park which operated from 1975 until 2003 in Somersby on the New South Wales Central Coast. Once a living tribute to the early years of Sydney's colonial settlement in the late 18th and early 19th centuries, the site is now used as a location for film and television production.

History
Old Sydney Town (OST) was developed by architect Frank Fox with the help of the Federal Government and the Bank of New South Wales.

Noted historian and distinguished heritage architect Robert Irving was the Research Director at OST for several years from the establishment of the project, when Frank Fox was the owner and entrepreneur and before anything new was erected. At the time he was a senior lecturer at the University of New South Wales (UNSW) and, at Frank Fox's request, gathered a research staff of four people to prepare the documentation for the buildings to be erected. The project was focussed on the pre-Macquarie period and the ideal of unimpeachable authenticity. Its overall control was initially in the hands of Fox and the Bank of NSW.

When Robert Irving was Year Master of the first year of the architecture course, it was arranged that the first-year students should erect the very first buildings at OST as a major component of their first year studies. All 130 students, divided into 13 groups, carried out historical research for each one of their chosen buildings, made scale models, calculated the required materials and prepared ordering lists, in the process learning the simple trades as necessary for each building at the Randwick workshop of the UNSW. Then afterwards they spent two weeks camping on the site and building each structure. A dozen members of staff lived there with Robert Irving for this time too as supervisors. Frank Fox arranged accommodation and catering as well as obtaining and delivering the materials. In that fortnight they built and mostly finished the thirteen buildings, learning to lay bricks, wattle-and-daub, shingles, tiles, thatch and other primitive materials just as the convicts were known to have used. Perhaps the most interesting to be erected was Bennelong's Hut, the original having been the first privately occupied brick building erected in Sydney.  Workmen at the site afterwards finished off what the students had been unable to complete. The whole exercise was a very successful and  memorable learning exercise for the first year students (and for the staff).

The research team were tasked to produce not only documentation for the continuing building program, but also documentation of landscaping, decoration, furnishing, costume, food, activities and suchlike for the attraction. A building campaign began, under the direction of Frank Fox and his sons Michael (architect) and Stephen (management), Peter (entertainment) and the other staff who had by then been assembled. The Projects completed included what was called Heritage Hall (the entrance and reception complex) and an increasingly large set of buildings including the first pub and restaurant. Some, such as the gaol and the church, were never finished. The windmill, which Robert Irving personally researched, was eventually almost completed but was never opened.

Old Sydney Town was officially opened on 26 January 1975, by Prime Minister Gough Whitlam.

The Wran state government took over the federal investment shortly after the Fraser government took power at the end of 1975. The park was leased to a private company, Warwick Amusements, who under the terms of the lease eventually purchased it from the State Government and later took a decision to close down this important and faithful reconstruction of colonial Sydney Town.

During its lifetime, the park had 6 million visitors.

In 1994/95 the park was used in the second season of Mighty Morphin Power Rangers for the three-part episode Return Of The Green Ranger as colonial Angel Grove. The ABC also filmed an important documentary resource for schools on the site.

When the park was closed in January 3‚ 2003, the commercial operators blamed the closure partly on what they called the "instant gratification" generation that demands computer games and thrill-rides, rather than a leisurely stroll through history.

Since the park closed to the public it has been let for movie shoots.

In February 2012 residents of the Central Coast banded together and formed a committee to re-open the park and several Facebook pages were started.

In February 2013 the Daily Telegraph reported that the family of Frank Fox (Michael and Peter Fox) were in negotiations with the current lease holders about reviving the town.

In the early hours of 20 February 2014, fire claimed Heritage Hall (the entrance and reception complex), on site and a significant part of the artefacts and documentation stored therein were lost. Firefighters from New South Wales Rural Fire Service and Fire and Rescue NSW battled the fires.

The park was sold in May 2018 to World Cultural Tourism Village. Future use of the land will be used as, a new Old Sydney Town, but half its old size, an expanded Sydney Reptile Park, community/public outdoor spaces, a tourist-oriented boutique shopping village, a hotel, function centres and fishing houses surrounding Sydney Cove, aquatic recreational activities also on Sydney Cove most likely as part of Old Sydney Town, potentially large-format retail, many residences, affordable and key-worker housing, eco-tourism, parking, open spaces, and conservation areas.

Consultations with the Concept Plan was undertaken between the 19 August and 13 September 2019. World Cultural Tourism Village is, as of April 2020, attempting to lodge a planning proposal application to amend the current land uses. They were supposed to do it around the end of 2019. There is no opening date or construction start date yet as of April 2020.

Attractions

The town was set out according to James Meehan's map of Sydney in 1803 and consisted of over 30 authentically reconstructed buildings. This reconstruction of 1803's Sydney closed exactly 200 years later.

 "Sydney Cove" - a recreation of Sydney Harbour
 Soldiers on parade
 Thundering cannons
 Pistol and sabre duels
 Convict rebellion
 Magistrate's court
 Convict punishment
 Bullock rides, horse-drawn wagons
 Craft stores
 Kiosk, tea shop, barbecue facilities

References

External links
Old Sydney Town website
Old Sydney Town television commercial
Heritage List Old Sydney Town Facebook page

Further reading
Documentation of historical research and other aspects of the history of the site and its development can be found in the Mitchell Library (Robert Irving's papers) and in the Gosford City Council Local Studies Library collection.

Defunct amusement parks in Australia
Open-air museums in Australia
Entertainment venues in New South Wales
1975 establishments in Australia
2003 disestablishments in Australia
Defunct museums in Australia